Bours is a commune in the Pas-de-Calais department in the Hauts-de-France region in northern France.

Geography
A farming village located 20 miles (32 km) northwest of Arras on the D89 road, in the valley of the river Clarence.

Population

Sights
 The church of Sainte-Austreberthe, dating from the eleventh century.

 The (restored) castle donjon, also from the eleventh century. Built of sandstone by Hugues de Bours.

See also
Communes of the Pas-de-Calais department

References

Communes of Pas-de-Calais